Ignaz Stojanich von Selin also written Ignaz Stoianich (Serbian Cyrillic: Игнатије Стојанић; Military Frontier, around 1741 - Agram, Habsburg Empire, 23 December 1807) was an Austrian general-major of Serbian origin. who is best remembered for participating in the quelling of a revolution in Transylyvania in 1784.

After receiving a high rank in the military it was customary for the recipient Ignaz Stojanich to have his social status elevated. On 17 July 1801, he became a baron with the predicate "von Selin". 

He retired from the military in 1807, the year he died on 23 December in Agram, now Zagreb.

References 

Austrian generals

1741 births
1807 deaths
Serbs of Croatia